Dallas McKinley Williams (born February 28, 1958), is a former professional baseball outfielder and coach. He played parts of two seasons in Major League Baseball with the Baltimore Orioles and Cincinnati Reds, and one season in Nippon Professional Baseball in 1988. Since 1989, he has been a baseball coach at various minor league levels, including serving as first base coach for the Colorado Rockies and Boston Red Sox. He is currently the hitting coach for the Saraperos de Saltillo of the Mexican Baseball League.

Playing career
Williams was selected by the Orioles with the 20th pick in the first round of the 1976 Major League Baseball Draft. He played for several years in their minor league system, but only had one brief cup of coffee at the major league level in 1981, when he went 1-for-2 in 2 games. Earlier in 1981, Williams played in the longest game in professional baseball history, Rochester's 3-2 33-inning loss at Pawtucket. Williams went 0-for-13 in the game. Williams' 0-13 line is also a record in futility in any single professional baseball game.

The following spring, the Orioles traded Williams to the Reds along with another minor leaguer in exchange for catcher Joe Nolan. Williams got a slightly more extended shot with Cincinnati, playing in 18 games in September, 1983, but he managed just 2 hits in 36 at bats. The following spring, Williams was traded to the Detroit Tigers, and from there he bounced around the minors for several more years. Following a season in Japan for the Hankyu Braves, Williams retired at the end of the 1988 season.

Coaching career
In 1989, Williams' coaching career began with the Kinston Indians. He spent the next several years as a roving minor league instructor for the Cleveland Indians and Chicago White Sox organizations, then returned to coaching at various minor league levels. In 2000, Williams secured his first coaching job at the major league level, serving as first base coach for the Rockies for three seasons. After spending 2003 as first base coach for the Boston Red Sox, Williams once again returned to coaching in the minors. He served as third base coach for the Gary SouthShore RailCats of the Northern League in 2010, but stepped down prior to the 2011 season. He is always a welcomed guest instructor at the New York Baseball Academy. Williams' was hired as the hitting coach for the EDA Rhinos 2013-2015 and picked up a new contract with Brother Elephants 2016–Present, also of the Chinese Professional Baseball League (Taiwan).

References

External links
, or Retrosheet, or Pura Pelota

 

1958 births
Living people
Abraham Lincoln High School (Brooklyn) alumni
African-American baseball coaches
African-American baseball players
American expatriate baseball players in Japan
Baltimore Orioles players
Boston Red Sox coaches
Bluefield Orioles players
Charlotte O's players
Cincinnati Reds players
Colorado Rockies (baseball) coaches
Evansville Triplets players
Gary SouthShore RailCats coaches
Hankyu Braves players
Indianapolis Indians players
Jacksonville Expos players
Major League Baseball first base coaches
Major League Baseball outfielders
Miami Orioles players
Minor league baseball coaches
Minor league baseball managers
Rochester Red Wings players
Sportspeople from Brooklyn
Baseball players from New York City
Tigres de Aragua players
American expatriate baseball players in Venezuela
21st-century African-American people
20th-century African-American sportspeople
EDA Rhinos coaches
EDA Rhinos managers
American expatriate baseball people in Taiwan